The 1983–84 Scottish Premier Division season was won by Aberdeen, seven points ahead of Celtic. St Johnstone and Motherwell were relegated.

Table

Results

Matches 1–18
During matches 1–18 each team plays every other team twice (home and away).

Matches 19–36
During matches 19–36 each team plays every other team twice (home and away).

References
1983–84 Scottish Premier Division – Statto

Scottish Premier Division seasons
1
Scot